François Dufault (or Dufaut) (before 1604 (?)ca. 1672?) was a French lutenist and composer.

Dufault was born in Bourges, France. As a student of Denis Gaultier, he enjoyed an excellent reputation as an instrumentalist, which is demonstrated in many contemporary sources where he was described as one of the greatest lutenists of his time. Almost no information is preserved about his life. He died, probably during the end of the 1660s or early 1670s, in England.

From his works has survived a collection of twelve lute compositions in tablature besides a few individual works in manuscript or other compilations. His works are written with a lot of harmonic freedom and nearly in an improvisatory style.

Life 

 François Dufaut composed music for the lute. His rhythmic sensitivity is remarkable. He left:
 twelve pieces of tablature in the collection entitled  Tablature de luth de différents autheurs sur des accords nouveaux, published by P. Ballard in 1631,
 a certain number of other pieces which remained in manuscript, scattered in the libraries of Vienna, Berlin, Paris, Rostock or Besançon, borrowing the form of dances with subtitles, which made the fortune of French harpsichordists,
 but also "tombeaux" in the Baroque music,  dedicated to the memory of a fellow musician, a poet or a simple friend.

He seems to have traveled a lot, especially in England.

He trained as a lutenist with Denis Gaultier, of whom he was a pupil around 1630, and whose manner is reflected many times in his own artistic expression.

Like most of the great composers of his time, Dufaut showed a certain inclination for harmony, without departing from the discretion and refinement that characterized his art.

Works 
Here are some of Dufaut's lute works, out of about 165 pieces:

 Suite en sol mineur :
 Prélude
 Allemande
 Sarabande & Double
 Courante suedoise
 Gigue
 Tombeau de Monsieur Blancrocher
 Suite en ut mineur :
 Prélude
 Allemande
 Courent
 Sarabande
 Guigue
 Suite en la mineur :
 Prélude
 Allemande
 Gigue
 Courante
 Courante
 Sarabande
 Suite en ut majeur :
 Allemande
 Sarabande
 Gavotte
 Sauterelle
 Pavane en mi mineur

Sources 
 Article "François Dufaut" in Silvo Riolfo Marengo, Encyclopédie de la musique, Paris, LGF, coll. La Pochothèque, 2000
 Article "François Dufaut" in Marc Vignal, Dictionnaire de la musique, volume 1, Paris, Larousse, 1999
Notice du disque François Dufaut, Jacques Gallot Pièces pour luth (interprète Pascal Montheilhet) written by François-Pierre Goy.

Discography 
 En 1976, Hopkinson Smith a enregistré un disque entier sous le label Astrée/Auvidis, (réf. As 15), réédité en CD en 1989 (réf. E 7735)
 Dufaut: 5 suites for lute by Louis Pernot at Accord (Musidisc) (Ref: 200262 MU 750) recorded in 1988
 François Dufaut, Jacques Gallot Pièces pour luth Pascal Montheilhet, disque Virgin
 In 2006, André Henrich dedicated an entire record to the composer, disque Aeolus.
 Les Accords Nouveaux II, record by Sigrun Richter devoted to suites by René Mézangeau, Nicolas Bouvier, Mr Dubuisson (Étienne Houselot), Nicolas Chevalier and François Dufaut.

References

External links
T. Crawford: The historical importance of François Dufault and his influence on musicians outside France 

17th-century deaths
French Baroque composers
French male classical composers
French lutenists
Musicians from Bourges
Year of birth unknown
17th-century classical composers
17th-century male musicians